UCSF Medical Center station (also signed as Mariposa Street) is a light rail station on the Muni Metro T Third Street line, located in the median of Third Street at Mariposa Street in the Mission Bay neighborhood of San Francisco, California. The station serves the UCSF Medical Center and the larger UCSF Mission Bay campus. The station opened with the T Third Street line on January 13, 2007. It has two side platforms; the northbound platform is north of Mariposa Street, and the southbound platform south of Mariposa Street, which allows trains to pass through the intersection before stopping at the station.

References

External links 

SFMTA: Third Street & Mariposa St northbound, southbound
SF Bay Transit (unofficial): Third Street & Mariposa St

Muni Metro stations
Railway stations in the United States opened in 2007